Victor Sloan MBE  (born 1945) is a Northern Irish photographer and artist.

Life and work
Sloan was born in 1945 in Dungannon, County Tyrone, Northern Ireland. He studied at the Royal School, Dungannon, Co. Tyrone and Belfast and Leeds Colleges of Art, the latter in England. He lives and works in Portadown, County Armagh in Northern Ireland.

Employing primarily the medium of photography, he manipulates his negatives and reworks his prints with paints, inks, toners and dyes. In addition to photography, he also uses video, and printmaking techniques.

Sloan's works are a response to political, social and religious concerns. He is perhaps best known for his works investigating the Orange Order in series such as: Drumming; The Walk, the Platform and the Field and The Birches.

Sloan was awarded an MBE in 2002. He is an academician of the Royal Ulster Academy, a Fellow of the Royal Society of Arts, and a Fellow of the Royal Photographic Society. He won the Academy's Conor Prize in 1988 and the Gold Medal in 1995 and 2008.

The Ormeau Baths Gallery, Belfast held a major exhibition of his work (Victor Sloan: Selected Works 1980–2000) in 2001. In 2008, the exhibition History, Locality, Allegiance, curated by Peter Richards at the Golden Thread Gallery, Belfast, brought together a comprehensive selection of past works, with a particular focus on his video works.

His exhibition Victor Sloan: Drift, curated by Dr Riann Coulter, Curator of the F.E. McWilliam Gallery & Studio and Feargal O'Malley, Curator at the University of Ulster, explored a related though distinct area, tracing the story of the Vietnamese Boat People who settled in Craigavon, Northern Ireland in 1979.

In preparation for this exhibition, Sloan rekindled his friendship with Ka Fue Lay, who was a teenager when he settled in Craigavon in 1979 and now lives in Salisbury, England. Sloan made a video in which Ka Fue Lay discusses his life in Vietnam, displays family photographs and fondly recalls his time in Craigavon. The exhibition also includes Sloan's black and white photographs of Craigavon from the late 1970s and early 1980s, contemporary images that he created by scratching, painting and bleaching photographic prints, and recent work including large colour photographs of Moyraverty.

Sloan's exhibition Before, in Belfast Exposed Gallery, Belfast, 2017, revealed an excerpt from an extensive but little-seen body of archival photographs that Sloan made in the 1970s and 80s in Northern Ireland. The images document the activities and characters that populated Sloan's daily life; the urban development of his hometown of Craigavon; and the constant and pervasive presence of the political conflict.

For the artist these photographs functioned as a type of preliminary 'sketchbook', shaping the distinctive style and thematics he would later become known for. Viewed together as an exhibition they represent Sloan's significant contribution to the tradition of Northern Irish documentary practice.

Books about Sloan and his work include Marking the North by Brian McAvera (1989), Victor Sloan: Selected Works by Aidan Dunne (2001), Victor Sloan: Walk, by Jürgen Schneider (2004), and Luxus by Glenn Patterson (2007).

Photoworks
A typical image from the Northern Irish works of Sloan is Walk X from 1985. It is a silver gelatin print. In it we see dead centre, splitting the image, a uniformed police officer with a peaked cap. He is in profile, staring tight-lipped at the parade, feet apart in a rooted stance, symbol of law-and-order but also unusually for the North, of impartiality, indicated by his dead centre stance. From the left a huge Lambeg drum, strapped to its unseen owner's chest, juts out across the body; but it has been rendered semi-transparent so that the outline shape of the police officer can still be seen.

On one level this drum functions as a musical instrument, the rhythmic 'keeper of the beat'. But the unhinged arm, wielder of a timpani-like drum-stick, indicates not only the wardrum call, but also the potential of the drum-stick as a weapon. On another level the drum is like a Jasper Johns target with its concentric circles of black, white, black and white again for the heart of the target. The paradox is that the police officer who has often been seen, in the eyes of Catholics, as the defender of the Protestant tradition, has now become a target for his own loyalist people (the police being a largely Protestant force).

Videoworks
Sloan's video work includes a 44-minute video of an 8 mm looped film fragment of The Little Rascals,(1930s), which destroys itself and catches fire. This was shown in the Gastag in Munich and in Toskanische Saulenhalle, Augsburg, Germany, 2004 as part of his installation Stadium. Gavin Weston in the Sunday Times describes it when first exhibited in the Old Museum Arts Centre, Belfast: "...a noisy trundling projector surrounded by four large prints at which one strains to peer through the blacked-out gloom. Staring back in time and this dingy light are the eyes of Adolf Hitler, bolstered by images of the Werner March/ Albert Speer – designed stadium that hosted the Berlin Olympics of 1936. There is no further direct reference to Jesse Owens, the Führer's gravest embarrassment, but flickering through this laden environment, archive footage of white children allowing a black child to draw the short straw, serves as an indicator".

The video work Walk (28 minutes, 2004.), has been shown in Berlin and Augsburg, Germany; Belfast, Portadown and Dublin, Ireland; Pretoria, South Africa; Bialystok, Poland; Madrid, Spain; Paris, France, and Damascus, Syria.

Susan McKay describes the video in the Irish Times: Walk shows, in slow, plodding motion, an Orange walk (as the parades are properly known to those who take part in them). The marchers appeared to disappear into a mirror, and the sound was distorted so that drumbeats sounded out suddenly like shots, and voices were slowed down to groans. In the end, the last shiny black shoe has marched into the mirror leaving an empty street. It is a melancholy piece".

Other video works include Drumcree (2001) and Fishtank (2006) Ka Fue Lay. (2014).

Publications
Lippard, Lucy R. (1985). Sloan, Victor in Divisions, Crossroads, Turns of Mind; Some New Irish Art. Ireland America Arts Exchange Inc., Wisconsin and Williams College Museum of Art, US 
McAvera, Brian (1986). Sloan, Victor in Directions Out – An investigation into a selection of artists whose work has been formed by the post 1969 situation in Northern Ireland. Dublin: Douglas Hyde Gallery. 
Mirfenderesky, Jamshid (1988). Sloan, Victor in Ulster Art in the 80s. Dublin: RHA Gallagher Gallery. 
McAvera, Brian (1989). Sloan, Victor in Art, Politics and Ireland. Dublin: Gill & Macmillan. 
McGonagle, Declan; James Odling-Smee; Gerry Burns (1989). Victor Sloan: Walls. Derry: Orchard Gallery. 
McAvera, Brian (1989). Marking The North-The Work of Victor Sloan. Dublin: Gill & Macmillan. 
Watkins, Jonathan; Burns, Gerry; Strather, Martin (1991). Sloan, Victor in Kunst Europa. H. Schmidt. 
Hutchinson, John (1990) Sloan, Victor in A New Tradition: Irish Art of the Eighties. Dublin: Douglas Hyde Gallery. 
Mellor, David; Wood, Nancy (1992). Sloan, Victor in I-D Nationale. Edinburgh: Portfolio. 
Roberts, John (1992). Sloan, Victor in Selected Errors, Writings on Art and Politics, 1981–1990. London: Pluto Press. 
O'Toole, Finton (1995). Sloan, Victor in Lie of the Land. Dublin: Gallery of Photography. 
Kelly, Liam (1996). Sloan, Victor in Thinking Long – Contemporary Art In The North Of Ireland. Dublin: Gandon Editions. 
Schneider, Jürgen (1996) Victor Sloan. Poland: Biuro Wystaw Artystycznych. 
Kelly, Liam (1996). Sloan, Victor in Paul Brennan and Catherine de Saint Phalle (eds), Désirs d'Irlande. Paris, France: Actes Sud. 
Williams, Val (1997). Sloan, Victor in On The Bright Side Of Life: Zeitgenössische Britische Fotografie. Berlin: Neue Gesellschaft für Bildende Kunst. 
Buckman, David (1998). Sloan, Victor in The Dictionary of Artists in Britain Since 1945. Samson. 
McCabe, Martin (1999). Sloan, Victor in Revealing Views. London: Royal Festival Hall. 
MacKillop, James (1999) Sloan, Victor in Contemporary Irish cinema. Syracuse, New York: Syracuse University Press. 
Brady, Ciaran (2000). Sloan, Victor in Encyclopedia of Ireland. New York: Oxford University Press, Inc. 
Kiang, Tanya; McCabe, Martin; Wilson, Michael (2001). Sloan, Victor in W. J. McCormack (ed.), Blackwell Companion to Modern Irish Culture. Oxford: Blackwell. 
Dunne, Aidan (2001). Victor Sloan: Selected Works 1980–2000. Belfast: Ormeau Baths Gallery. 
Clancy, Martin (2002). Sloan, Victor in Brian Lalor (ed.), The Encyclopedia of Ireland. Dublin: Gill and Macmillan. 
Graham, Colin (2003). Sloan, Victor in Allen, Nicholas; Kelly, Aaron (eds) The Cities of Belfast. Dublin: Four Courts Press. 
Schneider, Jürgen (2004). Victor Sloan: Walk. Augsburg, Germany: Kulturbüro der Stadt.
Tipton, Gemma (2005). Sloan, Victor in Space: Architecture for Art. Dublin: Circa. 
Graham, Colin (2005). Sloan, Victor in Cotter, Lucy (ed.), Third Text . "Every Passer-by a Culprit?", Kala Press/Black Umbrella. 
Alcobia-Murphy, Shane (2005). Sloan, Victor in Governing the Tongue in Northern Ireland: The Place of Art/The Art of Place. Newcastle: Cambridge Scholars Press. 
McAvera, Brian (2006). Sloan, Victor in Icons of the North: Collective Histories of Northern Irish Art. Belfast: Golden Thread Gallery. 
Gallagher, William (2006). Sloan, Victor in The National Self-Portrait Collection of Ireland – volume 2, 1989–1999. Limerick, Ireland: University of Limerick Press. 
Alcobia-Murphy, Shane (2006). Sloan, Victor in Sympathetic Ink: Intertextual Relations in Northern Irish Poetry. Liverpool, England: Liverpool University Press. 
Szabó, Carmen (2007). Sloan, Victor in Clearing the Ground. Cambridge Scholars Publishing. 
Patterson, Glenn (2007). Luxus. Portadown: Millennium Court Arts Centre. 
Richards, Peter (2008). Sloan, Victor in Contemporary Art: Northern Ireland. China, Museum of the Heilongjiang Daily
McGonagle, Declan (2008). Sloan, Victor in A Shout in the Street: Collective Histories of Northern Irish Art. Belfast, Northern Ireland: Golden Thread Gallery. 
Brady, Sara and Walsh, Fintan, eds (2009). Crossroads: Performance Studies and Irish Culture. Basingstoke, England: Palgrave, 
Sloan, Victor and Donnelly, Ann, eds (2009). My country is where I am, Craigavon: Arts Development: Craigavon Borough Council, 
Long, Declan (2009), Visual Art and the Conflict in Northern Ireland, Troubles Archive Essays. Belfast: Arts Council of Northern Ireland, 
Graham, Colin (2009), Visual Culture in Britain, Volume 10, Issue 2. Oxfordshire, England: Routledge, 
Kennedy, Brian (2010). Sloan, Victor in A View From Napoleon's Nose, Kaohsiung, Taiwan:  Kao Yuan Arts Centre,  
McGonagle, Declan (2010). Sloan, Victor in A shout in the street: Reflections on another way of looking, Wasafiri, Oxfordshire, England: Routledge, 
Maigron, Maryline, Salati, Marie-Odile, eds (2010). Sloan, Victor in La Surface: accidents et altérations, Éditions de l'université de Savoie, Paris, France, 
Carville, Justin (2011), Sloan, Victor in Photography and Ireland, Reaktion Books, London, England. 
Graham, Colin (2013), Sloan, Victor in Northern Ireland: 30 years of Photography, Belfast Exposed/The MAC, Belfast, Northern Ireland, 
Barber, Fionna (2013), Sloan, Victor in Art in Ireland since 1910, Reaktion Books, London, England, 
Johnston, Sandra (2013), Sloan, Victor in "Beyond Reasonable Doubt", LIT Verlag, 
Sverakova, Slavka (2014), Sloan, Victor in "The Faraway Nearby", F.E. McWilliam Gallery, Northern Ireland, 
Bosi, Lorenzo, Demetriou, Chares, Malthaner, Stefan, eds (2014), Sloan, Victor in  Dynamics of Political Violence, Ashgate Publishing, England, 
Marshall, Catherine and Murray, Peter, eds (2014), Sloan, Victor in Art and Architecture of Ireland, Volume V, Twentieth Century, Royal Irish Academy/Yale University Press, 2014, 
Victor Sloan: Drift. Banbridge, Northern Ireland: F E McWilliam Gallery, 2014. . With essays by Carville, Justin and Grant, Ken.
Bevan, Sara (2015), Sloan, Victor in Art from Contemporary Conflict, Imperial War Museum, London, 
Atkinson, Craig (ed.) (2016), "Northern Ireland One: Victor Sloan", series of three publications. Café Royal Books, Southport, England
Hickey, Ciara (2017), "Victor Sloan: Before", published by Belfast Exposed, Belfast, Northern Ireland, 2017,  
Long, Declan, (2017), Sloan, Victor in "Ghost-haunted land: Contemporary art and post-Troubles Northern Ireland", Oxford University Press, 
Murray, Ann, (2018),  Sloan, Victor in "Constructing the Memory of War in Visual Culture since 1914: The Eye on War", Routledge, 
Legg, George, (2018), Sloan, Victor in "Northern Ireland and the Politics of boredom", Manchester University Press, England, 
Muschter, Gabriele and Warnke, Uwe (2019), Victor Sloan in "Of People and Walls: 30 Years After the Fall of the Berlin Wall", Lukas Verlag für Kunst und Geistesgeschichte,

Notable exhibitions

EV+A, Exhibition of Visual Art, City Gallery of Art, Limerick, 1981
Independent Artists, Guinness Hop Store, Dublin, 1984
Views From Ulster, Touring exhibition curated by Colin Osman, Creative Camera, London. Peacock Gallery, Craigavon, Arts Council Gallery, Belfast, 1984-85
Irish Exhibition of Living Art, Guinness Hop Store, Dublin, 1985
Divisions, Crossroads, Turns of Mind: Some New Irish Art, curated by Lucy Lippard, touring US, Finland and Ireland, 1985–86
Victor Sloan: Drumming, Arts Council of Northern Ireland Gallery, Belfast, 1986
Next: Tomorrow, Cambridge Darkroom and Kettle's Yard, Cambridge, 1986
Contrasts, Fung Ping Shan Museum, Hong Kong, China, 1987
Critics' Choice, Fenderesky Gallery, Belfast, 1987
Directions Out, Douglas Hyde Gallery, Dublin, 1987
Magnetic North, Orchard Gallery, Derry and Impressions Gallery, York, 1987–88
Selected Images – A Sense of Ireland, curated by Declan McGonagle and James Coleman, Riverside Studios, London and Arnolfini Gallery, Bristol, 1988
Victor Sloan: The Birches, Orpheus Gallery, Belfast, 1988
Ulster Art in the 80s, RHA Gallagher Gallery, Dublin, 1988
Victor Sloan: Walls, Orchard Gallery, Derry, 1989
Sun Life Awards, National Museum of Photography, Film and Television (now the National Media Museum), Bradford, 1989
Irish Art of the Eighties, Douglas Hyde Gallery, Dublin, 1990
Heritage – Image and History, curated by Paul Wombel, City Art Gallery and Impressions Gallery, York; Cornerhouse, Manchester and Greenwich Citizens Gallery, London, 1990–91
Victor Sloan: Marking the North, Impressions Gallery, York and Cornerhouse, Manchester, 1990 – 92
Victor Sloan: Force Fields, Mannheimer Kunstverein, Germany, as part of Kunst Europa, 1991
Parable Island: Some Aspects of Recent Irish Art, Bluecoat Gallery, Liverpool, 1991
The Long Summer Still to Come: Some Aspects of Recent Irish Photography, Open Eye Gallery, Liverpool, 1991
I-D Nationale, Portfolio Gallery and 369 Gallery, Edinburgh, Scotland, 1992
Victor Sloan: Acts of Faith, Gallery of Photography, Dublin and touring UK, 1992–95
Bradford Print Exhibition, Cartwright Hall, Bradford, 1993
Victor Sloan: Initials, Baltic Gallery of Contemporary Art, Poland, 1994
Cease-fire: Reflections of Conflict, Wolverhampton Art Gallery, Wolverhampton, 1994
Victor Sloan: Borne Sulinowo, Orchard Gallery, Derry, 1995
The Lie of the Land, Gallery of Photography, Dublin, Centre Nationale de la Photographie, Paris, France and touring Europe, 1995–98
Victor Sloan: Poza Bornym Sulinowem, Baszty Czarownic, Slupsk, Poland, 1996
Victor Sloan: Seek Me, Goteborg Konstmuseum, Hasselblad Centre, Gothenburg and Bildmuseet Umea, Umea Universitets Museum, Sweden, 1996–97
Zeitgenössische britische Fotografie, Neue Gesellschaft für Bildende Kunst, Kunstamt Kreuzberg/Künstlerhaus Bethanien, Berlin. and Kunstverein Ludwigshafen, Germany, 1997–98
Troubled: Photography, Film and Video from Northern Ireland, The Light Factory, Charlotte; Contemporary Art Museum, Raleigh; Wake Forest University Fine Arts Gallery, Winston-Salem, North Carolina, US, 1998–1999
Victor Sloan: Stadium, Context Gallery, Derry; Old Museum Arts Centre, Belfast; galerie + edition caoc/Walden Kunstausstellungen, Berlin and Gasteig München, Munich, Germany, 1998–99
Victor Sloan: Selected Works, Medienzentrum, Bremen, Germany, 1999
Revealing Views: Images from Ireland, Royal Festival Hall, South Bank Centre, London, 1999
Troubled: An Exhibition of Irish Art, Pitshanger Manor Museum, London, 2000
Victor Sloan: Portadown, Orchard Gallery, Derry, 2000
Recent Work from Northern Ireland, curated by Wayne Bearwaldt, Plug In Institute of Contemporary Art, Winnipeg, Canada, 2001
Victor Sloan: Selected Works 1980–2000, Ormeau Baths Gallery, Belfast, 2001
The Public Eye: 50 years of the Arts Council Collection, Ormeau Baths Gallery, Belfast, 2002
Revealed Treasures, Long Gallery, Parliament Buildings, Stormont, Belfast, 2002
Political Works from the Arts Council Collection, Context Gallery, Derry, 2002
The Public Eye, City Art Gallery, Edinburgh, Scotland, 2003
Blue Skies, Grey Mists, Old Museum Arts Centre, Belfast, 2004
Open Secret, Imperial War Museum, London, 2004
Victor Sloan: Walk, Toskanische Saulenhalle, Augsburg, Germany, 2004
Seeing Orange, Millennium Court Arts Centre, Portadown, 2005
Beyond the Troubles: Kunst aus Irland, Raum5 Galerie, Berlin, Germany, 2005
Icons of the North: Collective Histories of Northern Irish Art, Socio-Political Art from 1969 -1994, Golden Thread Gallery, Belfast, 2006
Northern Propositions: Art of the Troubles, An Gaileraí, Falcarragh, Donegal, 2006
Icons of the North: Collective Histories of Northern Irish Art, Solstice Arts Centre, Navan, Co. Meath, 2006
Victor Sloan: Walk:, Théâtre Paris-Villette, Paris, France (Rencontres Internationales Paris/Berlin), 2006
Things We May Have Missed, curated by Peter Richards, Golden thread Gallery, Switch Room, Belfast, 2007
Victor Sloan: Luxus, Millennium Court Arts Centre, Portadown, 2007
Victor Sloan: Walk:, Diversions Festival, Gallery of Photography, Dublin (Projection, Meeting House Square), 2007
Victor Sloan: History, Locality, Allegiance, curated by Peter Richards, Golden Thread Gallery, Switch Room, Belfast, 2008
Breakthrough, Imperial War Museum, London, 2008–2010
Drawing a Line: A Contemporary Survey of Northern Irish Art, curated by Peter Richards, Museum of the Heilongjiang Daily, China, 2008
A Shout in the Street: Collective Histories of Northern Irish Art, curated by Declan McGonagle, Golden Thread Gallery, Belfast, 2008
An Eye for an Eye: Representations of Conflict in Ireland, curated by Dermot Keogh and Ruth Osborne, Lewis Glucksman Gallery, Cork, 2008/9
Arts Council of Northern Ireland Troubles Archive Exhibition, curated by Feargal O'Malley and Liam Kelly, Ormeau Baths Gallery, Belfast, 2009
The Northern Ireland Collection: Fresh Perspectives, curated by Zoë Lippett, Wolverhampton Art Gallery, Wolverhampton, England, 2009/10
A View From Napoleon's Nose, curated by Brian Kennedy, Kao Yuan Arts Centre, Kaohsiung, Taiwan, 2010
Elective Perspective, Galeria Arsenale, Białystok, Poland, 2010
The Art of the Troubles, Mid Antrim Museum, Northern Ireland, 2010
Victor Sloan: Walk, AllArtNow Gallery, Damascus, Syria, 2010
Portrait of the North, Wolverhampton Art Gallery, Wolverhampton, England, 2010–2011
Syrian Artists Talking, with Brian Kennedy, Naughton Gallery, Belfast, 2011
Images: Victor Sloan, Art and Design Academy, LJMU, Look International Photography Festival, Liverpool, England, 2011
Voices from the Levant, Context Gallery, Derry, with Brian Kennedy, 2011
 Nepotism+ 1, curated by Feargal O'Malley, Platform, Belfast, 2012
 Aleppo International Photography Festival, Aleppo, Syria, 2012
Picturing Derry, the City Factory, Derry, Northern Ireland, as part of UK City of Culture, 2013
Northern Ireland: 30 Years of Photography, the MAC and Belfast Exposed, Belfast, Northern Ireland, 2013
The Far Away Nearby, F E McWilliams Gallery & Studio, Banbridge, 2014
Art in the Eastside, Billboard Project, Creative Exchange, various locations, Belfast (invited artist) 2013
Art of the Troubles, Ulster Museum, Belfast, Northern Ireland, 2014
Voices Travel: A Conversation Between Two Harbours, Kaohsiung Museum of Fine Arts, Taiwan, 2014
Craigavon New Town: 50 Years of Modernity, curated by PLACE, Golden Thread Gallery, Belfast, 2014
Victor Sloan: Borne Sulinowo, The University Gallery, Belfast, 2014
Victor Sloan: Drift, F E McWilliams Gallery and Studio, curated by Dr Riann Coulter and Feargal O'Malley, Banbridge, Northern Ireland, 2014
Art of the Troubles, Wolverhampton Art Gallery, Wolverhampton, England, 2014-2015
Victor Sloan: The Baron, Belfast Print Workshop Gallery, Belfast, 2015
Victor Sloan: Before, Belfast Exposed Gallery, Belfast, Northern Ireland, 2017
Conflicting Images: Photography during the Northern Irish Troubles. Ulster Museum, Belfast, 2017–2018.
Aleppo, Tropenmuseum, Amsterdam, Holland, 2017
Crossing Lines, Highlanes Gallery, Drogheda, Ireland and F.E. McWilliam Gallery, Banbridge, Northern Ireland 2018–19. 
Troubles Art, Nerve Visual Gallery, Derry, Northern Ireland, 2019.
Of people and walls – 30 years after the fall of the Berlin Wall, Schloss Biesdorf, Berlin, Germany, 2019–2020.
Island Life, Bristol Museum and Art Gallery, part of Bristol Photography Festival, 2021.
Portrait of Northern Ireland: neither an elegy nor a manifesto, Centenary exhibition, Curated by Shan McAnena, Golden Thread Gallery, Belfast, 2021. 
Against The Image: Photography. Media. Manipulation, curated by Clare Gormley and Anna Liesching, Ulster Museum, Belfast, Northern Ireland, (Belfast Photo Festival), 2022. 

Images Are All We Have, The Paintwork’s, Dublin Castle, Dublin, Ireland. (PhotoIreland Festival), 2022.

Collections
Sloan's work is held in the following public collections:
Arts Council of Northern Ireland
Imperial War Museum, London
Ulster Museum, Belfast.
The Arts Council of Northern Ireland
State Art Collection, Ireland
Dublin City University
Martin Parr Foundation, Bristol, England 
Ulster Television Collection, Belfast
Lamar Dodd Arts Centre, Georgia, United States
National Media Museum, Bradford, England
The Northern Ireland Collection, Wolverhampton Art Gallery
Museum of International Contemporary Art, Salvador, Brazil
Department of Finance and Personnel, Northern Ireland
North West Arts Trust
Royal Ulster Academy of Arts
National Self-Portrait Collection of Ireland, University of Limerick.

References

External links

1945 births
Living people
People from Dungannon
People from Portadown
Multimedia artists from Northern Ireland
Photographers from Northern Ireland
Alumni of Ulster University
People educated at the Royal School Dungannon
Alumni of Leeds Arts University
Political artists
Irish contemporary artists
British contemporary artists
Members of the Order of the British Empire
Members of the Royal Ulster Academy